This is an incomplete list of Ambassadors and High Commissioners of Guatemala. High Commissioners represent member states of the Commonwealth of Nations and ambassadors represent other states. Note that some diplomats are accredited by, or to, more than one country.

Current ambassadors as of August 2018

See also
 Foreign relations of Guatemala
 List of diplomatic missions of Guatemala

References

 
Guatemala